Narita International Airport , also known as Tokyo-Narita, formerly and originally known as , is one of two international airports serving the Greater Tokyo Area, the other one being Haneda Airport (HND).

The conceptualization of Narita was highly controversial and remains so to the present day, especially among local residents in the area. This has led to the Sanrizuka Struggle, stemming from the government's decision to construct the airport without consulting most residents in the area, as well as expropriating their lands in the process. Even after the airport was eventually completed, air traffic movements have been controlled under various noise related operating restrictions due to its direct proximity with residential neighborhoods, including a house with a farm that is located right in between the runways. As a result, the airport must be closed from 00:00 (12:00am) to 06:00 (6:00am) the next day to minimize the noise pollution impact around the airport.

Narita is the busiest airport in Japan by international passenger and international cargo traffic. In 2018, Narita had 33.4 million international passengers and 2.2 million tonnes of international cargo. In 2018, Narita was also the second-busiest airport in Japan in terms of aircraft movements (after Haneda Airport in Tokyo) and the tenth-busiest air freight hub in the world. Its  main runway shares the record for longest runway in Japan with the second runway at Kansai International Airport in Osaka. Narita serves as the main international hub of Japan Airlines, All Nippon Airways and Nippon Cargo Airlines, and as a hub for low-cost carriers Jetstar Japan and Peach.

History

Construction and local resistance

Before Narita opened, Tokyo International Airport (Haneda) was Japan's main international airport. Haneda, on Tokyo Bay near densely populated residential and industrial areas, began to suffer capacity and noise issues in the early 1960s as jet aircraft became common. The Japanese transport ministry commissioned a study of alternate airport locations in 1963, and in 1965 selected a plan to build a five-runway airport in the village of Tomisato. This development plan was made public in 1966.

However, local residents were not consulted during the initial planning phase, and learned of the selection of the airport site through the news. This led to shock and anger among the local community, which continued for many years. Though the Japanese government had eminent domain power by law, such power was rarely used due to a preference to resolve land disputes consensually.

At the time, the socialist movement still had considerable strength in Japan, evidenced by the large-scale student riots in Tokyo in 1960. Many in the "new left" such as Chūkaku-ha opposed building Narita, reasoning that the real purpose for the new airport was to promote capitalism and to provide additional facilities for US military aircraft in the event of war with the Soviet Union. These individuals sought to ally with the more conservative local farmers who simply did not want to give up their land for the airport.

Similar strategies had already been employed during the postwar era to block the expansion of Tachikawa Air Base and other US military facilities in Japan. In June and July 1966, the Union sent formal protests to the mayor of Narita, the governor and vice-governor of Chiba Prefecture and the prefectural office of the Liberal Democratic Party. In November 1967, when the Transport Ministry began surveying the perimeter of the airport, Union members set up roadblocks. The Zengakuren radical student union then began sending students to Narita to help the local farmers. During eminent domain, three policemen were killed by activists.

Takenaka Corporation constructed the first terminal building, which was completed in 1972. The first runway took several more years due to constant fights with the Union and sympathizers, who occupied several pieces of land necessary to complete the runway and temporarily built large towers in the runway's path.

The airport opened under a high level of security; the airfield was surrounded by opaque metal fencing and overlooked by guard towers staffed with riot police. 14,000 security police were at the airport's opening and were met by 6,000 protesters; a Japanese newscaster remarked at the time that "Narita resembles nothing so much as Saigon Airport during the Vietnam War." Protestors attacked police on the opening day with rocks and firebombs while police responded with water cannons; on the other side of Tokyo, a separate group of protestors claimed responsibility for cutting the power supply to an air traffic control facility at Tokorozawa, which shut down most air traffic in the Tokyo area for several hours.

The conflicts at Narita were a major factor in the decision to build Kansai International Airport in Osaka offshore on reclaimed land, instead of again trying to expropriate land in heavily populated areas.

Japan's international flag carrier, Japan Airlines, moved its main international hub from Haneda to Narita, and Northwest and Pan American also moved their Asian regional hubs from Haneda to Narita. Pan American transferred its Pacific Division, including its Narita hub, to United Airlines in February 1986. Japanese domestic carrier All Nippon Airways began scheduled international flights from Narita to Guam in 1986.

Security
From 1978 to 2015, Narita Airport was the only airport in Japan where visitors were required to show ID upon entry, due to the tumultuous history of the airport's construction and the violent protests before, during, and after its opening. By 2012, Narita's operator was considering dispensing with the security checks. Given that the number of flight slots at Narita are also increasing, the anti-airport struggles were a long time ago, and Haneda Airport began to re-instate international flights, a council headed by Chiba governor Kensaku Morita consisting of prefectural government officials, the Narita International Airport Corporation and business groups in Narita, proposed scrapping the ID checks. The Chiba prefectural police objected, stating that the checks were necessary to detect extremists and terrorists.

NAA experimented with a new threat detection system for two months in 2013, using a combination of cameras, explosive detectors, dogs and other measures in lieu of passport and baggage checks upon entering the terminal. In March 2015, NAA announced that the ID checks would cease and the new system would be used for terminal building security, effective as of the end of that month.

Narita Airport was the first Japanese airport to house millimeter wave scanners. The Ministry of Land, Infrastructure and Transport announced in March 2010 that trials would be carried out at Narita from July 5 through September 10, 2010. Five types of machines were to be tested sequentially outside the Terminal 1 South Wing security checkpoint; the subjects were Japanese nationals who volunteered for trial screening, as well as airport security staff during hours when the checkpoint is closed.

Privatization

As part of this change, on April 1, 2004, New Tokyo International Airport was officially renamed Narita International Airport, reflecting its popular designation since its opening. The airport was also moved from government control to the authority of a new Narita International Airport Corporation, usually abbreviated to "NAA."

The headquarters is on the airport grounds. The authority previously had its head office in Tokyo with some offices in and around Narita; the head office moved and the Narita offices consolidated according to the decision by the Japanese Cabinet in July 1988 making it a special corporation. The NAA head office started operations at the airport on July 1, 1996, in the former Japan Airlines operations center, acquired by NAA in July 1994. Renovations occurred from September 1995 to March 1996. After the move, the Kishimoto Building in Marunouchi, Chiyoda, Tokyo housed the NAA's Tokyo functions.

To assist in the relationship with the local community, NAA operates the Community Consultation Center (地域相談センター) and the Airport Information Center (空港情報センター). The Community Consultation Center is in the Chiyoda Branch of Shibayama-machi Community Center in Osato, Shibayama, while the Airport Information Center is located in Sanrizuka, Narita.

Expansion and increased capacity

New Tokyo International Airport was originally envisioned to have five runways, but the initial protests in 1965 led to a down-scaling of the plan to three runways: two parallel northwest–southeast runways  in length and an intersecting northeast–southwest runway  in length. Upon the airport's opening in 1978, only one of the parallel runways was completed (16R/34L, also known as "Runway A"); the other two runways were delayed to avoid aggravating the already tense situation surrounding the airport. The original plan also called for a high-speed rail line, the Narita Shinkansen, to connect the airport to central Tokyo, but this project was also cancelled with only some of the necessary land obtained.

By 1986, the strengthening Japanese yen was causing a surge of foreign business and leisure travel from Japan, which made Narita's capacity shortage more apparent. Although the government could legally force a sale of the land, it elected not to do so "because of fears of more violence." By 1991, Narita was handling 22 million passengers a year, despite only having a design capacity of 13 million.

Terminal 2 and the second runway "B"

On November 26, 1986, the airport authority began work on Phase II, a new terminal and runway north of the airport's original main runway. To avoid the problems that plagued the first phase, the Minister of Transport promised in 1991 that the expansion would not involve expropriation. Residents in surrounding regions were compensated for the increased noise-pollution with home upgrades and soundproofing.

Terminal 2 opened on December 4, 1992, at a cost of $1.36 billion. The new terminal had approximately 1.5 times the space of the older terminal, but its anti-congestion benefits were delayed because of the need to close and renovate much of the older terminal. The airport's land situation also meant that the taxiway to the new terminal was one-way for much of its length, and that taxi times between the terminal and runway were up to 30 minutes.

The Runway B (16L/34R) opened on April 17, 2002, in time for the World Cup events held in Korea and Japan that year. The runway was further impeded by a three-story concrete building in the path of its taxiway, which the Union had constructed in 1966, forcing the taxiway to bend inward toward the runway. This imposed restrictions on the number of aircraft that could use the runway, since it was impossible for an aircraft to safely pass through the curve in the taxiway while another aircraft was using the runway. Runway B's limitations were made particularly apparent following the 2009 crash of FedEx Express Flight 80, which shut down Runway A and forced some heavy aircraft to divert to other airports such as nearby Tokyo Haneda Airport.

In 2008, the Supreme Court of Japan ruled in favor of the airport authority regarding ownership of Union-occupied land in the path of the taxiway, allowing the taxiway to be modified to provide enough room for safe passing. The building remained in place until August 2011, when authorities removed it under a court order; 500 police officers were dispatched to provide security for the operation while 30 airport opponents protested. Beginning on October 20, 2011, the airport was approved to allow simultaneous landings and take-offs from the A and B runways. The approval allowed the airport to increase annual take offs from 220,000 to 235,000 and increase hourly departure capacity from 32 to 46.

Transit upgrades

Since its construction, Narita has been criticized for its distance from central Tokyo, with journeys taking an hour by the fastest train and often longer by road due to traffic jams. Narita's distance is even more problematic for residents and businesses in west Tokyo and Kanagawa Prefecture, both of which are much closer to Tokyo International Airport (Haneda Airport).

Through the end of the 1980s, Narita Airport's train station was located fairly far from the terminal, and passengers faced either a long walk or a bus ride (at an additional charge and subject to random security screenings). Transport Minister Shintaro Ishihara, who later served as governor of Tokyo, pressed airport train operators JR East and Keisei Electric Railway to connect their lines directly to the airport's terminals, and opened up the underground station that would have accommodated the Shinkansen for regular train service. Direct train service to Terminal 1 began on March 19, 1991, and the old Narita Airport Station was renamed Higashi-Narita Station.

The Narita Rapid Railway opened on July 17, 2010, and shaved 20 minutes off the travel time. A new expressway, the North Chiba Road, is also under construction along the Narita Rapid Railway corridor. Improvements such as the Wangan Expressway also shaved off travel time to Kanagawa Prefecture by bypassing Tokyo.

The Japanese government has also invested in several local infrastructure projects in order to address the demands of airport neighbors. The largest of these is the Shibayama Railway, a short railway connection between the Keisei Main Line and the area immediately east of Narita Airport. This line opened in 2002 with government and NAA support after extensive demands from Shibayama residents, and provides a direct rail link from Shibayama to Narita City, Chiba City and central Tokyo. Another such project is the Museum of Aeronautical Sciences in Shibayama Town, which draws tourists and student groups to the area.

Future developments

Runway B extension
A further extension of the Runway B to  has been under official consideration since 2014. Permitting for the extension was approved in January 2020. The final plan calls for the runway to be extended to the northwest, and requires a 430-meter section of the Higashi-Kanto Expressway to be replaced with a tunnel beneath the runway; construction is scheduled to be complete in fiscal year 2028.

Runway C
The airport's original master plan also included a planned  third "C" runway, which would be a crossing runway south of the passenger terminals. Although the majority of the land and equipment required in order to build the runway are under NAA's ownership, small portions of land needed to be accessed in order to build the runway are still blocked by airport protesters, and areas south of the South Wing of the terminal are being used as aircraft parking and storage. Noise abatement would also be an issue, especially since there are major towns such as Yachimata on the planned departure/arrival routes. Noise abatement negotiations would have to be worked through in order to use the runway, otherwise a Kai-Tak style approach would be necessary, which is less than favourable. For these following reasons, building work on the third "C" runway was finally aborted.

In March 2018, NAA released a new masterplan for expansion, which included a third "Runway C" on the east side of the airport to be completed by 2028. The new runway will increase the airport's annual slot capacity from 300,000 to 460,000. The runway project will enable the airport to extend the airport's operating hours to cover the period between 12:30 a.m. and 5:00 a.m. Local authorities agreed to the expansion plan after an 18-month process due to the need for further local revitalization. The final plan, approved in January 2020 and published in December 2021, calls for a 3,500 meter runway on the east side of the airport, built over two underground road tunnels, with completion by fiscal year 2028.

Terminals 
In September 2022, NAA announced a conceptual plan to consolidate the three existing terminals into a single facility called "One Terminal." Plans had previously called for a fourth terminal building to be added in conjunction with the construction of Runway C, but due to the aging of the older terminals, NAA opted to plan for the replacement of the older terminals with new structures. The plans also call for a new cargo facility and upgraded transit links to central Tokyo.

Terminals
Narita was among the first airports in the world to align its terminals around the three major international airline alliances. Since 2006, the airport has arranged for SkyTeam carriers to use the North Wing of Terminal 1, Star Alliance carriers to use the South Wing of Terminal 1, and Oneworld carriers to use Terminal 2.

Terminal 1

Two circular satellites, Satellites 1 (gates 11–18) and 2 (gates 21–24), are connected to the North Wing. Satellites 3 and 4 (gates 26–38 and gates 41–47) compose a linear concourse connected to the Central Building. Satellite 5 (gates 51–58) is connected to the South Wing.

Check-in is processed on the fourth floor, and departures and immigration control are on the third floor. Arriving passengers clear immigration on the second floor, then claim their baggage and clear customs on the first floor. Most shops and restaurants are located on the fourth floor of the Central Building. The South Wing includes a duty-free mall called "Narita Nakamise", one of the largest airport duty-free brand boutique mall in Japan.

The North Wing has served as an alliance hub for SkyTeam since 2007, and previously housed the Northwest Airlines hub, which was acquired by Delta Air Lines in 2010; Delta stopped flying to Narita in March 2020. Other carriers in the North Wing are Aero Mongolia, Aircalin, Aurora Airlines, China Southern Airlines,  El Al, Etihad Airways, Hong Kong Airlines, Jin Air, Peach Aviation international flights, Royal Brunei Airlines, Sichuan Airlines, and Zipair Tokyo.

The South Wing and Satellite 5 opened in June 2006 as a terminal for Star Alliance carriers. The construction of the South Wing took nearly a decade and more than doubled the floor area of Terminal 1. Today, almost all Star Alliance members, including Japan's All Nippon Airways, use this wing, along with non-members Air Busan, Air Seoul, Scoot, Shandong Airlines, and Uzbekistan Airways.

ANA and Peach domestic flights use a separate area of the terminal accessed from the arrivals floor of the South Wing.

Terminal 2

The two were connected by the Terminal 2 Shuttle System, which was designed by Japan Otis Elevator and was the first cable-driven people mover in Japan. A new walkway between the main and satellite buildings began operation on September 27, 2013, and the shuttle system was discontinued. Terminal 2 can handle large aircraft like the Airbus A380 (operated by Emirates) and the Boeing 747-8.

Terminal 2 includes a duty-free mall called "", the largest duty-free mall in Japan.

For domestic flights, three gates (65, 66, and 67) in the main building are connected to both the main departures concourse and to a separate domestic check-in facility. Passengers connecting between domestic and international flights must exit the gate area, walk to the other check-in area, and then check in for their connecting flight.

Japan Airlines is currently the main operator in T2. The terminal has served as a hub for all Oneworld alliance carriers at NRT since 2010, when British Airways moved from Terminal 1. Several other airlines also use the terminal, including SkyTeam carriers China Airlines and China Eastern Airlines, as well as Star Alliance carrier Air India and non-affiliated carriers Air Macau, Bamboo Airways, Batik Air Malaysia, Eastar Jet, Emirates, Fly Gangwon, Greater Bay Airlines, Hainan Airlines,  MIAT, Nepal Airlines,  Pakistan International Airlines, Philippine Airlines, Starlux Airlines, Thai AirAsia X, Tigerair Taiwan, T'way Air, and VietJet.

All Nippon Airways and several other Star Alliance carriers used Terminal 2 prior to the expansion of the Terminal 1 South Wing in 2006.

Terminal 3

Terminal 3, a terminal for low-cost carriers, opened on April 8, 2015. The new terminal incorporates several cost-cutting measures, including using decals instead of lighted directional signs and using outdoor gates and airstairs instead of jet bridges, which are intended to reduce facility costs for airlines and their passengers by around 40% on international flights and 15% on domestic flights. Taisei Corporation was awarded a ¥11.2 billion contract to build the terminal in January 2013. The airport also constructed a new LCC apron to the north of the terminal, with five additional parking slots for Airbus A320 and similarly sized aircraft.

Jeju Air, Jetstar, Jetstar Japan, Spring Airlines, and Spring Japan use Terminal 3. The terminal also includes a 24-hour food court, which is the largest airport food court in Japan, and a multi faith prayer room.

Airlines and destinations

Passenger

Cargo

Statistics

Busiest routes

Airport operation statistics

Number of passengers

Cargo volume (tons) 

Source: Japanese Ministry of Land, Infrastructure, Transport and Tourism

Other facilities

Air traffic control towers

There are three air traffic control towers at Narita. The main control tower and one of the ramp control towers stand on the geographical center the airport, and another ramp tower is directly above Terminal 2. The main tower is used by Japan Civil Aviation Bureau's ATC, while the ramp towers are used by the NAA officers. The ramp control will be transferred to the brand new tower in 2020.

Jet fuel supply pipelines
The airport is connected by a  pipeline to the port of Chiba City and to a fuel terminal in Yotsukaido. The pipeline opened in 1983, and had pumped 130 billion liters of fuel to Narita Airport by its thirtieth anniversary of operations in 2013.

Corporate offices
Previously NCA had its headquarters on the fourth floor of the ).

The subsidiary airline JALways once had its headquarters in the building. All Nippon Airways also has a dedicated "Sky Center" operations building adjacent to Terminal 1, which serves as the headquarters of ANA Air Service Tokyo, a ground handling provider that is a joint venture between ANA and the airport authority.

Airport hotels
NRT has one on-site hotel, the Airport Rest House adjacent to Terminal 1. The hotel is operated by TFK, a company that also provides in-flight catering services from an adjacent flight kitchen facility. A capsule hotel opened adjacent to Terminal 2 in July 2014 in order to serve both transit passengers and passengers on early-morning low-cost carrier flights.

Museums
The Museum of Aeronautical Science is located on the south side of Narita Airport and has a number of aircraft on exhibit, including a NAMC YS-11 and a number of small piston aircraft.

Ground transportation

Rail

Narita Airport has two rail connections, with airport express trains as well as commuter trains running on various routes to Tokyo and beyond. Two operators serve the airport: East Japan Railway Company (JR East), and Keisei Electric Railway. Trains to and from the airport stop at Narita Airport Terminal 1 Station in Terminal 1 and Narita Airport Terminal 2·3 Station in Terminal 2.

JR trains

Narita Express runs from the airport via the Narita and Sōbu lines to Tokyo Station. The trainsets divide at Tokyo, with one set looping clockwise around central Tokyo to the Shōnan–Shinjuku Line, stopping at Shibuya, Shinjuku, Ikebukuro, Ōmiya and/or Takao, while the other set proceeds south to Shinagawa, Yokohama and Ōfuna through the Yokosuka Line. Trains normally run non-stop between Narita Airport and Tokyo, but during rush hours they also stop at Narita, Sakura, Yotsukaidō and Chiba to accommodate commuters. 

A rapid service train is the suburban JR service to the airport. It follows the same route to Tokyo Station but makes 15 intermediate stops en route, taking 80 min as opposed to the non-stop 55-min Narita Express. From Tokyo Station, most trains continue through the Yokosuka Line to Ōfuna, Zushi, Yokosuka and Kurihama in Kanagawa Prefecture. A single trip to Tokyo Station on this route costs ¥1,320.

"Green Car" (first class) seats are available on both trains for an additional surcharge.

Keisei trains
Keisei operates two lines between Narita Airport and central Tokyo. The newer Keisei Narita Airport Line follows an almost straight path across northern Chiba Prefecture, while the older Keisei Main Line passes through the cities of Narita, Sakura and Funabashi. The lines converge at Keisei-Takasago Station in northeast Tokyo and then follow a common right-of-way to Nippori Station and Keisei Ueno Station, both located on the northeast side of the Yamanote Line that loops around central Tokyo.

Keisei operates a number of trains between the airport and Tokyo:
Skyliner is the fastest train between the airport and the Yamanote Line. Travel time is 36 min to Nippori and 41 min to Keisei Ueno. Tokyo Station can be reached in 50 min with a transfer to the Yamanote Line. A single trip from the airport to Nippori Station costs ¥2,470, making the Skyliner one of the cheapest limited express train options between the airport and Tokyo.

A single trip to Nippori Station on this route costs ¥1,440.

Access Express suburban trains run through the Narita Sky Access Line but with intermediate stops en route. A single trip from the airport to Nihombashi Station (on the Toei Asakusa Line) costs ¥1,330. Most Access Express trains run to Haneda Airport via the Toei Asakusa Line and Keikyu Main Line before 5pm, while after that most services run to Nippori and Keisei Ueno.

Limited Express suburban trains run through the Keisei Main Line. These are the cheapest and slowest trains between Narita and central Tokyo, reaching Nippori in 70–75 min and Keisei Ueno in 75–80 min. A single trip to Nippori Station on this route costs ¥1,030.

All seats are reserved on the express "Liner" services, while the suburban "Express" services use open seating.

Bus

There are regular bus (limousine) services to the Tokyo City Air Terminal in 55 minutes, and major hotels and railway stations in the greater Tokyo area in 35–120 minutes. These are often slower than the trains because of traffic jams. The chief operator of these services is Airport Transport Service under the "Friendly Airport Limousine" brand. Other operators include Keisei Bus, Chiba Kotsu and Narita Airport Transport.

There is also an overnight bus service to Kyoto and Osaka. Buses also travel to nearby US military bases, including Yokosuka Navy Base and Yokota Air Base.

Taxi
Fixed rate taxi service to Tokyo, Kawasaki, Yokohama, Yokosuka, and Miura is available for 14,000 – 40,300 yen (expressway tolls, which cost 2,250 – 2,850 yen, are not included in the fixed fare, and need to be paid as a surcharge). Operated by Narita International Airport Taxi Council Members.

The main road link to Narita Airport connects to the Shuto Expressway network at Ichikawa, Chiba.

Helicopter
Mori Building City Air Service offered a helicopter charter service between Narita and the Ark Hills complex in Roppongi, taking 35 minute and costing 280,000 yen each way for up to five passengers; however, the service was discontinued on December 1, 2015.

Transfer to/from Haneda Airport
Haneda Airport is approximately 1.5–2 hours from Narita Airport by rail or bus. By rail, the Keisei Electric Railway runs direct trains between Narita and Haneda in 101 minutes for ¥1740 as of May 2012. The Tokyo Monorail runs from Haneda to Hamamatsuchō Station in 15–20 minutes. A short transfer to Japan Railway train to Tōkyō Station is required to connect to the Narita Express train to Narita airport. There are also direct buses between the airports operated by Airport Limousine Bus. The journey takes 65–85 minutes or longer depending on traffic.

Accidents and incidents
 1985: On June 22, a piece of luggage exploded while being transferred to Air India Flight 301, killing two baggage handlers and injuring four other staff. The luggage had originated at Vancouver International Airport. Fifty-five minutes later, another piece of luggage, also originating from Vancouver, exploded on Air India Flight 182, killing all on board.
 1997: United Airlines Flight 826 experienced severe turbulence after leaving Narita en route for Honolulu. Due to injuries sustained by passengers, the aircraft made an emergency landing at Narita. One woman on the flight died of her injuries.
 2003: January 27: All Nippon Airways Flight 908 (operated by Air Japan), a Boeing 767 aircraft arriving from Incheon International Airport, South Korea, overshot on Runway 16L/34R after landing. The runway was closed overnight due to necessary investigations and repairs. This was the first such incident of overrunning at Narita and an overnight closing to occur at the airport since its opening in 1978.
 2009: On March 23, FedEx Express Flight 80, an MD-11 aircraft from Guangzhou Baiyun International Airport, China, crashed on Runway 16R/34L during landing, killing both the pilot and co-pilot. Runway 16R/34L, which is required for long-distance flights and heavier aircraft, was closed for a full day due to necessary investigations, repairs and removal of wreckage. This was the first fatal airplane crash to occur at the airport since its opening in 1978.
 2018: On July 31, Air Canada Flight 5, a Boeing 787–8 (reg: C-GHPV) aircraft from Montréal-Trudeau International Airport, entered a closed taxiway upon landing on Runway 16L/34R. No injuries were reported on this incident, but the aircraft was stuck for over five hours, as well as the incident resulting in Runway 16L/34R being closed for over 6 hours.

Current issues

Competitiveness
Complaints over slots and landing fees have plagued the busy airport. Because so many airlines want to use it, the Japanese aviation authorities extend use time for Narita International Airport until midnight, and cut cost by denationalization. In 2004, New Tokyo International Airport Authority (NAA) was privatized and turned into Narita International Airport Corporation (NIAC). Narita's landing fees were once more than double of those of Incheon International Airport (¥195,000 in November 2012), Singapore Changi Airport, and Shanghai Pudong Airport (¥170,000 in November 2012). In 2014, the policy of Open skies was implemented. Airlines can increase or decrease the number of its flights freely, and Narita's landing fees were cut by up to 50%.

LCC service
In October 2010, Narita announced plans to build a new terminal for low-cost carriers (LCCs) and to offer reduced landing fees for new airline service, in an attempt to maintain its competitiveness against Haneda Airport.

In July 2011, ANA and AirAsia announced that they would form a low-cost carrier subsidiary, AirAsia Japan, based at Narita. Later in 2011, JAL and Jetstar Asia announced a similar low-cost joint venture, Jetstar Japan, to be based at Narita. Skymark Airlines opened a domestic base at Narita in November 2011, and by February 2012 was operating 70 departures per week from NRT. Skymark cited the lower fees at NRT as a key reason for this move. Spring Airlines Japan, an LCC partly owned by Spring Airlines, plans to begin service in 2014 with NRT as its primary base.

Narita's restricted hours, congestion and landing fees have caused difficulties for LCCs operating at the airport. On Jetstar Japan's first day of operations in July 2012, a departing flight was delayed on the tarmac for one hour, forcing a cancellation. Less than two weeks later, a departing Jetstar Japan flight from Narita to New Chitose Airport was significantly delayed such that the return flight to Narita using the same aircraft could not arrive before the 11 PM curfew, forcing another cancellation. LCCs at Narita currently use the corner of Terminal 2, which is farthest from Runway A, often requiring a long taxi time.

See also

 Chōfu Airport
 Haneda Airport
 Ibaraki Airport
 Transport in Greater Tokyo

Notes

References

External links

Historical and political
 "Editorial – Narita fiasco: never again," The Japan Times, July 26, 2005
 Stephan Hauser, "Field of dreams – filled with concrete," Tokyo Journal, Feb. 2000
 Appeal to Stop Use of the Second Runway at Narita Airport
 

 
1978 establishments in Japan
Transport in Chiba Prefecture
Airports in Japan
Transport in the Greater Tokyo Area
Buildings and structures in Chiba Prefecture
Airports established in 1978
Real estate holdout
Transport in Narita, Chiba